The Australian Ballet School is the premier ballet training facility in Australia, located in Melbourne.

History
The Australian Ballet School was founded in 1964 as the primary training facility for The Australian Ballet by Dame Margaret Scott.

Location
It is part of the Australian Ballet Centre, which is located in the Melbourne Arts Precinct, Southbank in Melbourne, Victoria.

Governance and funding
The school is a registered charity, with about a third of its income provided by the Australian Government, about a third by tuition fees (33%), and the rest via philanthropy, corporate support and box office. It is one of eight "national elite training organisations" funded by the Office for the Arts as part of its or ARTS8 (Australian Roundtable for Arts Training Excellence) group of colleges.

Education
The Australian Ballet School is a registered training organisation. The Australian Ballet Company draws 95% of its dancers from the school, and many graduates dance as principals and soloists around the world.

Offered are:
 an eight-year course from age ten for gifted students.
 after school program (Levels 1–3), for students between 10 and 13 years of age. Classes take place after school hours and on Saturdays.
 interstate/international training (levels 1–4), for students between 8 and 14 years of age who are gifted in dance but live interstate or internationally. There are only limited spots in level four for gifted students that are not yet ready to leave home.
 full-time program (Levels 4–8), for students between 13 and 19 years of age. Level 4 is taken in conjunction with academic year 9 at Victorian College of the Arts Secondary School-VCASS (across the road from the Australian Ballet Centre). Half the day consists of dance classes and the other half consists of academic classes, Monday to Friday. Half a day of dance classes on Saturday.

Audition process

Once a year, the Australian Ballet School conducts preliminary auditions for the After School Program (students aged 10–13 years), Interstate Training Program (students aged 8–14) and the Full-Time Program (students aged from 13 years) in Melbourne, Sydney, Brisbane, Adelaide and Perth.

The preliminary auditions involve a short physical examination, to evaluate if the dancer is physically suitable for a career in classical ballet, and a classical ballet class, modified so the dancer can demonstrate natural coordination and musicality. Successful applicants for the After School Program and Interstate/International Training Program are notified in the weeks following these local auditions. For the Full-Time Program, a National Finals week is held in Melbourne. This is an intensive audition process. The finalists spend three days being examined by the School's dance teachers, doctor and physiotherapists to determine their suitability for full-time study and a career in classical ballet. Interstate or international students may initially audition by video for the Full-Time Program. If successful, they will then be asked to audition in Melbourne during the National Finals week. Successful candidates are notified in the fortnight following the National Finals.

The audition for the Full-Time Program involves a simple class where the instructions set by an Australian Ballet School Official are easy to understand and follow. If on the day they are found to be suitable, they are then invited to spend three days of examination through classes. It is then when the school decides whether they are willing to offer the auditionee a place at the school.

The Dancers Company 
The Dancers Company was set up in 1980 as an integrated part of The Australian Ballet under the direction of the Associate Artistic Director. Students from the Graduate Year (Level 8) who meet the required dance standard are selected to perform with the Company throughout regional Australia.

Directors
 Dame Margaret Scott DBE (1964–1990)
 Gailene Stock AM (1990–1998)
 Marilyn Rowe OBE (1998–2014)
 Lisa Pavane (2015–present)

Notable alumni

References

External links

The Australian Ballet

Ballet schools
Educational institutions established in 1964
Dance education in Australia
School, Australian Ballet
1964 establishments in Australia
Dance schools in Australia
Ballet in Australia
History of education in Australia
Performing arts in Melbourne
Buildings and structures in the City of Melbourne (LGA)
Southbank, Victoria